Bijay Dhimal (born 4 October 1986) is a defender playing for Three Star Club in Martyr's Memorial A-Division League.

Domestic career 
In domestic league Dhimal played for Machhindra F.C., Jawalakhel Youth Club and Three Star Club.

International career
Dhimal was a hardworking and a successful Martyr's Memorial A-Division League player. Due to which he was called up for National Team on 2013. His debut match was 2013 AFC Challenge Cup qualification. He also played friendly matches against Bahrain national football team and Kuwait national football team on 2013.

References

External links
 

Living people
1992 births
Nepalese footballers
Nepal international footballers
People from Morang District
Three Star Club players
Manang Marshyangdi Club players
Association football defenders
Machhindra F.C. players